Paul Polillo (born April 24, 1967) is a Canadian former professional ice hockey player. He played in the Colonial Hockey League (later renamed the United Hockey League) for nine seasons, winning the UHL Most Valuable Player Award three years in succession.

Playing career
Born in Brantford, Ontario, Polillo played college hockey with Western Michigan University from 1986 until 1990, and was drafted by the Pittsburgh Penguins in the 1988 NHL Supplemental Draft. After college, he played professionally in Italy with Latemor for two seasons. In 1992, he joined the Brantford Smoke of the Colonial league, where he played until 1998, with one tryout with the Denver Grizzlies in 1994–95. He then played three seasons with the Port Huron Border Cats, before retiring from professional hockey. He then played in Ontario Hockey Association senior league play with the Dundas Real McCoys and the Brantford Blast before retiring from competitive hockey in 2006.

Awards and honours

References

External links
 

1967 births
Brantford Smoke players
Denver Grizzlies players
Port Huron Border Cats players
Sportspeople from Brantford
Living people
Ice hockey people from Ontario
Western Michigan Broncos men's ice hockey players
Canadian ice hockey centres
National Hockey League supplemental draft picks
Pittsburgh Penguins draft picks